The E. P. Taylor Stakes is a Thoroughbred horse race for fillies and mares held annually since 1956 in October at Woodbine Racetrack in Toronto, Ontario, Canada. It is run on the E. P. Taylor turf course at a distance of  miles.

Originally run as the Nettie Handicap, the race was renamed in 1981 to honor the late Edward Plunket Taylor, President of the Ontario Jockey Club from 1953 to 1973 and a founder of the Jockey Club of Canada. An inductee of the Canadian Horse Racing Hall of Fame, E. P. Taylor owned Windfields Farm, Canada's most successful horse breeding operation.
 
The E. P. Taylor Stakes is a Grade I event with a purse of CAN$600,000 and draws horses from across North America as well as Europe. It is raced as a companion event to the Canadian International Stakes and can be a final stepping stone for the Breeders' Cup Filly & Mare Turf, depending on the time frame between the running of the two races.

Distances
Over the years, the race has been contested at various distances:
 1956–1961 –  miles on dirt at Greenwood Raceway
 1962–1963 –  miles on dirt at Woodbine Racetrack
 1964–1967 –  miles on dirt at Woodbine Racetrack
 1968 to date –  miles on turf at Woodbine Racetrack

Records
Time record: (at current  miles distance on turf)
 2:00.68 – Mrs. Lindsay (2007)

Most wins:
 2 – Kitty Girl (1957, 1958)

Most wins by an owner:
 3 – Gardiner Farm (1968, 1969, 1970)

Most wins by a jockey:
 3 – Sandy Hawley (1976, 1978, 1982)
 3 – John R. Velazquez (2004, 2005, 2011)

Most wins by a trainer:
 3 – Lou Cavalaris Jr. (1968, 1969, 1970)
 3 – Frank H. Merrill Jr. (1960, 1964, 1973)
 3 – Maurice Zilber (1975, 1978, 1982)

Winners

See also
 List of Canadian flat horse races

References

Grade 1 stakes races in Canada
Turf races in Canada
Middle distance horse races for fillies and mares
Woodbine Racetrack
Recurring sporting events established in 1956